Below is a list of songs that topped the RIM Charts in 2017 according to the Recording Industry Association of Malaysia.

Chart history

Notes

References

External links
Recording Industry Association of Malaysia

2017 in Malaysia
Malaysia
2017